Gingoog, officially the City of Gingoog, is a 2nd class component city in the province of Misamis Oriental, Philippines. According to the 2020 census, it has a population of 136,698 people.

History 
The term Gingoog originally came from the word "Hingoog", which means "Goodluck", from a Lumad tribe of Manobo who settled in the area. The word implies good fortune, thus Gingoog means the City of Good Luck.
The natives of this place are the ones with the family names of "Gingco", and "Gingoyon".

Gingoog was founded as a mission by Spanish missionaries in 1750. It was one of the oldest localities in Misamis Oriental Province, older than the province's capital and economic hub, Cagayan de Oro which was founded in 1871. It was made part of the town of Talisayan until it was incorporated as an independent municipality in 1908.

In 1957, the sitio of Binuangan was converted into a barrio known as Talisay.

Cityhood

Gingoog was turned into a city via Republic Act No. 2668 signed by President Carlos P. Garcia circa June 18, 1960.

Geography 
Gingoog is located in the Province of Misamis Oriental in the Northern Mindanao Region on Mindanao island. It is bounded on the east by the Municipality of Magsaysay; on the west by the Municipality of Medina; on the south by the Municipality of Claveria; and on the north by Gingoog Bay.

Climate

Barangays 
Gingoog is politically subdivided into 79 barangays. In 1957, the sitio of Malibod was converted into a barrio.

The 79 barangays are the following:

Demographics

Economy 

The city's total income during year 2000 reached P296,731.65, of which 292,077.262.40 or 98.43% accrued in the General Fund while P4,653,809.25 or 1.5% accrued in the Special Education Fund.  Comparatively, the 1999 income level of P250.64 Million has increased by P46.09 Million or 18.39%.  The biggest bulk of the city's income was derived from tax revenues complementing around 95.5% of the total earnings of the year.  One major component of this income class is the Internal Revenue Allotment (IRA) which contributed a total amount of P259.69 Million or 93.04%.  Said IRA has increased by P37.43 Million or 16.83% against that of 1999.  Local revenue contributed only 10.04% of the city's total annual income.

Total expenditure incurred by the city for the whole year reached to about P243.54 Million, of which P239.66 Million was spent from the General Fund and P3.88 Million was spent from the Special Education Fund.  Comparatively, an increase of about P9.76 Million or 4.17% over 1999.

By expense class, personal services absorbed as much as P161.74 Million or 66.41%.  That includes the services of the devolved employees, newly created positions as mandated by R.A. 7160 and project engaged workers.  Maintenance and other operating expenses followed with P45.35 Million, or 18.62%, then Capital Outlay with P36.46 Million, or 14.97%.

References

External links 

 [ Philippine Standard Geographic Code]
 Philippine Census Information
 
 Local Governance Performance Management System

Cities in Misamis Oriental
Populated places established in 1750
1750 establishments in the Philippines
Component cities in the Philippines